Ghost Valley Raiders is a 1940 American Western film directed by George Sherman and written by Bennett Cohen. The film stars Don "Red" Barry, Lona Andre, LeRoy Mason, Tom London, Jack Ingram and Ralph Peters. The film was released on March 26, 1940, by Republic Pictures.

Plot
Government agent Tim Brandon, comes to Silver City to investigate a series of stagecoach and gold shipment disappearances. During the investigation he teams with the local sheriff and stagecoach line worker Linda to take on the local gang responsible for the disappearances.

Cast
Don "Red" Barry as Tim Brandon aka The Tolusa Kid 
Lona Andre as Linda Marley
LeRoy Mason as Frank Ewing
Tom London as Sheriff
Jack Ingram as Sam Kennelly
Ralph Peters as Deputy Hank
Horace Murphy as Mob Ringleader
Curley Dresden as Henchman Rawhide
Yakima Canutt as 1st Stage Driver

References

External links
 

1940 films
1940s English-language films
American Western (genre) films
1940 Western (genre) films
Republic Pictures films
Films directed by George Sherman
American black-and-white films
1940s American films